The Rumpler C.IX was a German single-engine, two-seat reconnaissance biplane of World War I.

Development
At the end of 1916, the Rumpler design bureau, led by Edmund Rumpler, conceived the two-seat reconnaissance 7C 1 alongside the single seat 7D 1 fighter (which became the Rumpler D.I) Rumpler's 7C 1 design was given the designation C.IX by the Idflieg. The Rumpler C.IX had single I-type interplane struts and a smooth oval multi-stringered fuselage.

The first C.IX began testing in the spring of 1917. As a result of flight tests, a constructive flaw in the vertical rudder was revealed. After completion, the second version of the aircraft was successfully tested and a contract was signed for the production of a small series of 20 aircraft (with numbers 1501/17 -1520/17).

Operators

Luftstreitkrafte

Specifications (C.IX)

References

Bibliography
 Gray, Peter and Thetford, Owen. German Aircraft of the First World War. London, Putnam, 1962.

 Munson, Kenneth. Aircraft of World War I. London: Ian Allan, 1967. .
 Munson, Kenneth. Bombers, Patrol and Reconnaissance Aircraft 1914 - 1919. 
 Munson, Kenneth. Fighters, Attack and Training Aircraft 1914 - 1919. .

External links

1910s German military reconnaissance aircraft
Military aircraft of World War I
Biplanes
C.IX
Single-engined tractor aircraft
Aircraft first flown in 1917